Antti Petteri Orpo (born 3 November 1969) is a Finnish politician serving as the leader of the National Coalition Party since 2016. He has previously served as Deputy Prime Minister of Finland from 2017 to 2019, Minister of Finance from 2016 to 2019, Minister for Agriculture and Forestry from 2014 to 2015 and Minister of Interior from 2015 to 2016.

Early life and education 
Antti Petteri Orpo was born on November 3rd 1969 in Köyliö, Finland. He passed the Finnish matriculation exams and graduated from Köyliön lukio. Later Orpo earned a master's degree in political sciences from the University of Turku. Orpo attended Finland's mandatory national armed service and became a reserve officer. His current reserve rank is captain.

Political career

Minister of the Interior 
During his tenure as Minister of the Interior, Orpo received support for his handling of the 2015 migration crisis from coalition partners in the anti-immigration Finns Party, as well as from opposition lawmakers.

Minister of Finance 
In May 2016, Orpo announced that he would challenge the chair of the National Coalition Party and incumbent Minister of Finance Alexander Stubb in June's party conference. At the time, Orpo joined second-term parliamentarian Elina Lepomaki in seeking to replace Stubb. In contrast to polyglot and outspoken Stubb, Orpo was widely seen as a careful consensus-seeker with little experience of international politics. Orpo received 441,4 votes against Stubb's 361 and was thus elected as the new chair for the party. Orpo soon announced that he would take Stubb's seat as the Minister of Finance. He was officially appointed as the Minister of Finance on 22 June 2016.

In June 2017, Prime Minister Juha Sipilä and Orpo announced said they could not cooperate with their parties’ third coalition partner, the Finns Party, anymore, citing differences in core values and in the immigration and EU policies. For both Sipilä and Orpo, at stake were major healthcare and local government reform, which were key to their plan to balance public finances.

In addition to his national political roles, Orpo co-chaired (alongside Valdis Dombrovskis) the EPP Economic and Financial Affairs Ministers Meeting, which gathers the center-right European People's Party (EPP) ministers ahead of meetings of the Economic and Financial Affairs Council (ECOFIN).

Opposition politics 

In December 2019 Orpo attempted a vote of no-confidence in the incumbent government. This would then cause new elections, which Orpo hoped on winning. The incumbent government was accused of malpractice in responding to problems in the labor market. Later, Prime Minister Antti Rinne resigned, and Kulmuni publicly refused to join the National Coalition Party's plan of premature elections.

Other activities

European Union organizations
 European Investment Bank (EIB), Ex-Officio Member of the Board of Governors (2016-2019)
 European Stability Mechanism (ESM), Member of the Board of Governors (2016-2019)

International organizations
 Asian Infrastructure Investment Bank (AIIB), Ex-Officio Member of the Board of Governors (2016-2019)
 European Bank for Reconstruction and Development (EBRD), Ex-Officio Member of the Board of Governors (2016-2019)
 Joint World Bank-IMF Development Committee, Member (2018-2019)
 Multilateral Investment Guarantee Agency (MIGA), World Bank Group, Ex-Officio Member of the Board of Governors (2016-2019)
 Nordic Investment Bank (NIB), Ex-Officio Member of the Board of Governors (2016-2019)
 World Bank, Ex-Officio Member of the Board of Governors (2016-2019)

References

|-

|-

|-

|-

1969 births
Living people
People from Köyliö
National Coalition Party politicians
Deputy Prime Ministers of Finland
Ministers of Agriculture of Finland
Ministers of the Interior of Finland
Ministers of Finance of Finland
Members of the Parliament of Finland (2007–11)
Members of the Parliament of Finland (2011–15)
Members of the Parliament of Finland (2015–19)
Members of the Parliament of Finland (2019–23)